Rolando Álvarez Suárez (born 1975-12-14) is a Venezuelan football defender who made a total number of 20 appearances for the Venezuela national team between 1999 and 2001. He started his professional career at Internacional de Lara.

International career

International goals

Scores and results list Venezuela's goal tally first.

References

External links
 
 rsssf

1975 births
Living people
Association football defenders
Venezuelan footballers
Venezuela international footballers
1999 Copa América players
Caracas FC players
Estudiantes de Mérida players
Trujillanos FC players
Deportivo Italia players
Zamora FC players